Sung Jae-gi (September 11, 1967 – July 26, 2013) was a South Korean men's rights activist. Sung founded and was the first chairman of Man of Korea, a men's rights group advocating the abolition of the Ministry of Gender Equality and Family—whose Korean name (여성부; 女性部) translates as "Ministry of Women"—and demanded compensation for the South Korean military-service requirement.

During the early 21st century, Sung led the South Korean anti-feminist movement opposing female-preferential policies. In early adulthood he was a businessman, and in October 1999 he participated in the movement opposing the abolition of preferential treatment for discharged soldiers. Sung also opposed the abolition of the Hoju system, and later participated in men's-rights activities. In 2006 he founded the Association of Anti-Feminism and Male Liberation, and in 2007 he founded the Association for the Abolition of the Ministry of Women. The following year, Sung founded Man of Korea and was its chairman from 2008 until his death in 2013. His business activities included a nightclub and a consulting and executive search company.

From 1999 until his death Sung argued for the restoration of the Korean Army bonus points system (군가산점 제도), and during the early 2010s he was an activist for the abolition of women-only facilities. In 2011, he began offering assistance and counseling to battered husbands, househusbands, teenage runaways and male and child victims of violent crime. Sung opened a shelter for homeless persons, male victims of violent crime, teenage runaways and gay and transgender people. From 1999 to 2013, Sung was part of the gender liberation and liberal movements and the movement to abolish the women's special-benefits policy.

Near the end of his life Sung was reportedly up to ₩100 million in debt, and on July 25, 2013 he posted on the Man of Korea website his intention to commit suicide. The next day, Sung jumped from the Mapo Bridge in Seoul. His body was found four days later.

Sung wrote under the pen names Blue Wolf, Tongbalbass and Tongbal, and his nickname was Shimheon (심헌 審軒 or 심헌 心軒), Chongjuk(청죽 靑竹). chinese name was Im-sung(임성 臨聖). His family is part of the Changnyeong Sung clan (창녕성씨 昌寧成氏).

Early life 
Sung was born in Daegu on September 11, 1967. His father was wealthy, and his one uncle was a police officer in Daegu. During his youth, he developed masculinity and machismo. Sung became hostile, and was repulsed by traditional masculine behavior. In adolescence he became convinced of the need for men's liberation: "I was so grown, but nowadays teenage and 20, 30s young men are not like that. They tell another if it hurts, 'I am sick', tell another if they're tired, 'I am tired'.

At that time Sung became conscious of authority, developed a loathing for the patriarchal system and complained that South Korean society treated males cruelly. After graduating from Daegu High School, he began studying economics at Yeungnam University in 1985 and graduated in February 1993.

Young adulthood 
In 1987, Sung joined the South Korean Army and served with the 3rd Infantry Division (육군 제3보병사단 陸軍第三步兵師團) in Cheolwon (Gangwon Province) until 1990. He spent his early twenties as an insurance salesman, briefly managing his own business. In 2006, he operated a night club in Daegu. From August 26 to November 30 of that year, Sung worked for the Thomas McFly Consulting and Headhunting Company (토마스 맥플라이 컨설팅 & 헤드헌팅사) in the Eastern District of Daegu before resigning to continue his human-rights campaigns.

During the early 2000s, Sung joined the South Korean men's rights movement and campaigned for a variety of causes. On November 26, 2006 he founded the Association of Anti-Feminism for the Liberation of Men, and on January 4, 2007 he founded the Association for the Abolition of the Ministry of Women (女性部廢止運動本部). In 2013, both groups had several thousand members. Sung campaigned for the abolition of the Ministry of Gender Equality and Family in the 2002 and 2007 presidential elections, questioning its justification. After the 2000s Sung emphasized personal values, individual rights and the right to privacy in his speeches, saying that personal values are God-given rights. He later led a campaign to abolish the Ministry of Gender Equality.

In August 1994 Sung married Park Eun-kyong, an internist and professor at the College of Medicine of Chung-ang University. They had two daughters.

Criticisms, including pornography control 
In 1999 Sung opposed abolishing the South Korean military's bonus-points system (군 가산점;軍 加算點) and military veterans' compensation, and supported the abolition of the South Korean female quota (여성 할당제;女性割當制) and female employment quota systems (여성고용할당제;女性雇傭割當制). From 2004 to January 2005, he unsuccessfully opposed the abolition of the Hoju system (호주제 戶主制). Sung advocated the resurrection of the South Korean military bonus-points system and the abolition of female quotas until his death.

Railing against what he saw as female chauvinism and Korean totalitarianism, he argued against reverse discrimination, said "Men are humans", objected to unilateral obligations and responsibilities imposed on Korean men and advocated men's liberation. According to Sung, "The oppressive measures on pornography by the Korean government are totally insane ... It is actually seen that it oppresses masculinity and that it distorts the essentials. It is all done by the Ministry of Gender Equality and women’s organizations led by Korean feminists." He argued that the totalitarianism of a few female chauvinists excessively suppressed male sexuality, the arts, pop culture and freedom of expression and thought.

Comparing South Korean government policies to prohibition in the United States, Sung said that restricting pornography had undesirable side effects and labeled normal men as sex offenders. He encouraged self-examination to overcome sexual Puritanism: "You will understand easily if you know a bit about men’s sexual mechanism. Pornography itself can ease and satisfy men’s sexual impulses." Long criticized for his beliefs, Sung called South Korean policy excessively moralistic and overprotective of women and some South Korean politicians unrealistic and incompetent.

Movement to protect military bonus points system 
From August 1999 to 2001, Sung advocated the protection of the South Korean military's bonus-points system and had a small number of sympathizers. In October 2001 the system was found unconstitutional and repealed, with Sung advocating its reconstruction: "What is my duty? Do you know why Man of Korea started? Because in 1999 military bonus points were abolished! Because of the excuse of gender equality for threatening national security."

Sung long argued for the "resuscitation of military bonus points", reviving a reconstruction movement for the Korean military bonus-points system in 2011. He participated in civil-rights and masculist activities, leading a male-liberation movement. Sung requested compensation for his mandatory South Korean military service until his death.

Men's rights movements

Fathers' rights movement 
From 2004 to January 2005 Sung supported the Hoju system, reasoning that the system supported the last rights of fathers. Feeling that the system had symbolic meaning for fathers and families, he argued with South Korean radical feminists on the Internet. The Hoju system was abolished in January 2005, and Sung advocated its revival until his death.

He long criticized the Ministry of Gender Equality. On December 12, 2012, Sung told presidential candidate Park Geun-hye that to "recover lost fathers' rights is the way for my family's happiness".

Male protection 
From 2008 until his death, Sung was protective of weak men and disadvantaged, gay and transgender people and advocated for the protection of male and young victims of domestic violence. He opened male-protection facilities, the first on January 26, 2008 in Samsung-dong, Gangnam-gu.

Sung supported refuges in Samseong-dong in Gangnam-gu, Seokcheon-dong in Songpa-gu and Yeongdeungpo-dong in Yeongdeungpo-gu, Seoul. He opposed racism and discrimination against minorities, male victims of crime, the weak and sexual minorities. Sung encouraged the recognition of homophobia, emphasizing that sexuality is personal, and provided accommodations and job placement for homeless, unemployed young male runaways and gay and transgender people. He opened the Man of Korea headquarters as a shelter on May 1, 2012.

Men's rights 

On January 24, 2011, Sung opened a free facility in Samseong-dong, Gangnam-gu, Seoul for runaway husbands, young deported men, runaway teenage boys and homeless men. After a slow start, the facility took in an increasing number of people.

Pornography advocacy 
Sung opposed crackdowns on pornography until his death, arguing that it reduced the number of sex crimes. At a conference, he said that if women's attire does not cause sex crimes, neither does pornography.

According to Sung, pornography was necessary for economically- and physically-unattractive men. At a November 12, 2011 debate entitled "How Should We Regulate Child Pornography?" hosted by Choi Min-hee of the Democratic United Party at the National Assembly building in Yeouido, Seoul, Sung said: "Who are those crazy beings who oppose the protection of children and teens against sex crimes? ... The problem is the Burberry men [exhibitionists]. We should catch them, and not just make them not wear Burberry trench coats." Sung became an overnight hero to male netizens for defending online pornography and masturbation as benign.

During a public hearing of the National Assembly that day, Sung criticized the Ministry of Gender Equality: "For those people who don't even understand the mechanisms of the male sex, what Youth Sex Protection Law do you want? What law do you want to be made? ... Who are those crazy beings who oppose the protection of children and teens against sex crimes? Of course our priority is to protect kids and teens against sexual offenses. Have any of you watched porn before? Have you watched porn to masturbate? Yes or no? But let me ask you one thing: is your goal to protect children and teenager from sexual offences? or is it to suppress every man’s sexual desire and control his guilt?Female exposure is not the cause of one’s sex drive, and is not the cause of sex offenses, and yet animated porn becomes the cause of a man’s sex crimes? Please stop making such bullshit claims! I don’t know about other men, but isn’t this nonsense? I too watch porn! And you know why?" He said that pornography was "a means for a man to ease his sex drive, relieve himself, and excrete his load. So because porn amplifies a man’s sex drive, this makes him go outside, find a new victim and commit a new sex crime? Please stop romanticizing the whole thing!" According to Sung, "Just 20 years ago, women would go to the pharmacy and hide their sanitary pads in newspaper and buy them as if they were drugs. But 20 years later, Korean women’s sanitary pads are in your face, and they even have a menstruation festival ... Had men not acknowledged and understood femininity, do you think this would have been possible?"

Man of Korea

Founding 
On January 26, 2008, Sung founded Man of Korea (男性聯帶) in Gangnam-gu, Seoul to promote men's rights, saying that men could be considered a minority in South Korean society. He publicly disparaged women and worked to abolish menstrual leave and other policies for working women. Opponents said that Sung's work to support the rights of men was misplaced because South Korea is a male-dominated society.

During the 2012 Korean presidential election Sung suggested abolishing the Ministry of Gender Equality and Family, denying that women are a social minority and accusing Korean society of discriminating against men. He controversially posted on his Twitter account, "Korean women, you should be ashamed of yourselves. Why are you making such a fuss about menstruating when the nation’s birthrate is the lowest in the world?"

White Stockings Campaign 
Sung mocked the White Tie Campaign organized by the Ministry of Gender Equality and Family, saying that the campaign supported prostitution (although he was said to have supported prostitution). On November 28–29, 2011, Man of Korea launched their "White Stockings Campaign" in an email to members.

The email claimed that the campaign was supported by the ministry, but the campaign lampooned the ministry's support program for former prostitutes. Man of Korea claimed that under the ministry plan, former prostitutes would receive job training at support centers and the ministry would give them ₩410,000 per month and legal and medical services for up to three years. Sung was criticized for his support of prostitution and said on November 30, "We wanted to show that the ministry’s support program for former prostitutes is not effective. The ministry spends about 11-12 billion won per year on the program. But such support is given to any women who claim they were prostitutes, and the ministry is unable to verify whether they were really engaged in the sex trade or not".
His view that prostitutes were not victims contrasted with that of South Korean feminists,  and he opposed treating female prostitution as a crime.

Menstrual-leave criticism 

Sung criticized South Korean menstrual leave as sexist, arguing that it was unnecessary for most women since it protected motherhood. On October 3, 2012, he controversially posted on his Twitter account: "You [Korean women] should be ashamed of yourselves. Why are you making such a fuss about menstruating when the nation's birthrate is the lowest in the world?" According to a January 2013 report by Alio, a website compiling management information in the public sector, 9.1 percent (272 out of 2,993) executive jobs in government departments and public firms were held by women and over half of the organizations had no female board members.

Death and impact

Preparation 
In early July 2013, Sung's wife briefly left him. On July 25, he declared himself a victim of reverse discrimination and announced his intention to commit suicide. Sung jumped from the Mapo Bridge into the Han River, leaving a note saying that he would risk his life to raise ₩100 million (about $94,000) in donations to pay debts owed by Man of Korea.

He posted on the organization's website, "Dear citizens, I plan to jump off a bridge over the Han River. I hope you give us a last chance. Please lend us 100 million won which will be used for paying back debt and seed money of our organization". Sung's announcement was met with indifference. "Ridiculous. He is begging for money and he’s holding himself as a hostage", read a post on the Man of Korea homepage. Another read, "Threat fund-raiser? That’s creative. Just jump off the bridge like you promised". Sung later said that he did not intend to commit suicide, but wanted to draw attention to his group; he would jump, whether or not he received the money. He posted on Twitter, "Why do you all assume that jumping off the bridge will kill me? I have complete confidence in my survival", and later said: "Please regard my actions as 'trying to be less pathetic' while asking for money". Some Man of Korea members and other supporters were concerned about the jump.

Jump 
Sung repeated his intention to survive the jump, saying that the bulgogi party scheduled for 7 pm in his office that day was still on. "That’s why I said I’ll jump BEFORE 7 o’clock. Let’s eat bulgogi", he said. Before Sung jumped off the bridge, he wrote "I'm confident that I can survive". He checked the depth of the water before he jumped, and arranged for a lifeguard to watch the jump. However, he acknowledged the risk: "If something goes wrong with me, the Secretary General will succeed me as the representative of the association. Please remember me even if my lame attempt fails." He left a note:

On July 26, 2013, Sung took a taxi from Yeongdeungpo to Mapo District with Han Seung-oh, Lee Ji-hun and five other people. Although he was accompanied by two lifeguards, it had rained heavily that day and the day before. At 3:00 pm, Sung jumped from the Mapo Bridge. just before the Jump, he was last said "Male is one human(남자도 사람이다. Namjado Saramyida)".

Rescue efforts began at about 3:20 pm, and a broad search of the Han River was conducted. Although about 30 firefighters and a helicopter searched near the Mapo Bridge, he was not found by 9 pm Friday and the search was suspended for the night. About 50 firefighters from the Yeongdeungpo Fire Station, one helicopter and three rescue boats continued the search Saturday and Sunday; six ambulances stood by. On July 28, 2013.

Sung's body was found near the south end of the Seogang Bridge, connecting Yeouido to northern Seoul, on July 29. 
He was barefoot, and his white shirt and dark-gray pants were what he was wearing when he jumped. On August 1, Sung was cremated and his ashes buried in a crypt in the Gyongsan Park Cemetery (경산 공원 묘원) in Namchon (남천면), Gyeongsan, North Gyeongsang. There was a reported month-long increase in copycat suicides in August 2013.

Legacy 
According to the Korea Times, the online grief and rage were misplaced. Han Seung-oh, Sung's nominated successor and a founding member of Man of Korea, called Sung's jump a "risky stunt" to raise ₩100 million for the organization.

See also 

 Politics of South Korea
 Na Hye-sok
 Heo Jung-suk
 Han Chi-hwan

References

External links 

 Sung Jae-gi's Twitter account 
 Man of Korea Webpage/ 남성연대 

1967 births
2013 deaths
Suicides by jumping in South Korea
Suicides by drowning in South Korea
Male critics of feminism
Masculists
People from Daegu
South Korean agnostics
South Korean anti-feminists
South Korean humanitarians
Yeungnam University alumni